Andrius Skuja (born 9 August 1992) is a Lithuanian Paralympic athlete who competes in javelin throw and shot put events at international track and field competitions. He is a triple European champion and has competed at the 2020 Summer Paralympics. He was born with plexopathy in his right shoulder following complications at birth.

References

1992 births
Living people
Sportspeople from Šiauliai
Paralympic athletes of Lithuania
Lithuanian male javelin throwers
Lithuanian male shot putters
Athletes (track and field) at the 2020 Summer Paralympics
Medalists at the World Para Athletics European Championships